The discography of the American jazz artist Herbie Hancock consists of forty-one studio albums, twelve live albums, sixty-two compilation albums, five soundtrack albums, thirty-eight physical singles, nine promo singles and four songs not released as singles, but that charted due to downloads. This article does not include re-issues, unless they are counted separately from the original works in the charts, furthermore because of the enormous amount of material published, this discography omits less notable appearances in compilations and live albums. The discography shows the peak weekly main chart positions of eight selected countries: United States, France,[a] Germany, Japan,[b] Netherlands, Sweden,[c] Switzerland and United Kingdom. Positions also listed on United States are R&B / hip hop, dance / club, jazz[d] and bubbling under charts.[e] The peaks do not refer necessarily to the position that a record reached when it was first released. Also included are certifications from the Recording Industry Association of America (RIAA)[f] and the Bundesverband Musikindustrie (BVMI).[g]

Hancock made his debut as professional musician in the early 1960s as a sideman, quickly earning a good reputation. Blue Note Records noticed his talent and added him to its roster. For the label, he released seven albums, including Takin' Off (1962), his first solo album, supported by the single "Watermelon Man", which is one of the most performed jazz standards; Empyrean Isles (1964) and Maiden Voyage (1965), two influential jazz albums. During these years, Hancock also began a career as composer for film and television soundtracks, beginning with Blow-Up (1966) for MGM Records. In this role, he reached the top in 1986 with the Round Midnight soundtrack (for Columbia Records), that had its best result on the AFYVE Spanish Albums Chart at No. 18 and won an Academy Award for Best Original Score. After his departure from Blue Note, Hancock signed with Warner Bros. Records, publishing three albums in which he experimented with new jazz music directions: the R&B-oriented Fat Albert Rotunda (1969) and the electronic-oriented Mwandishi (1971) and Crossings (1972). These three releases became influential in the jazz rock movement.

Hancock continued to experiment after leaving Warner Bros. for Columbia Records, where he remained until the late 1980s, releasing sixteen studio albums. At Columbia, Hancock had his best commercial results, gaining immediate success with Head Hunters (1973), an R&B-oriented jazz album with strong funk influences. It peaked at No. 13 on the Billboard 200 and became the best-selling jazz album for a period of time. In 1986, it became the first jazz album ever to win a RIAA Platinum Award and is considered very influential in jazz, funk, soul and hip-hop music. Head Hunters also contains Hancock's first mainstream hit, "Chameleon" (1974), which peaked at No. 35 on the RPM Canadian Singles Chart and is a jazz standard. Other albums that followed in the style of Head Hunters with good popular success, especially in the US, were Thrust (1974) and Man-Child (1975), which ranked respectively No. 13 and No. 21 on the Billboard 200. In 1978, Hancock added disco influences to his jazz and established himself as a mainstream hitmaker across Europe with "I Thought It Was You" (1978) and "You Bet Your Love" (1979), which peaked, respectively, at No. 15 and No. 18 on the UK Singles Chart, and "Tell Everybody" (1979), which peaked at No. 22 on the Belgian Flemish Singles Chart. Thanks to these singles, his albums Sunlight (1978) and Feets, Don't Fail Me Now (1979) earned good popular success, especially in Europe. The first album had its best performance peaking on UK Albums Chart at No. 26, and the second peaked on the VG Norwegian Albums Chart at No. 18.

In 1983, Hancock radically refreshed his sound with strong electronic influences and released Future Shock (1983), an influential album in jazz fusion, dance, electronic, techno and hip-hop music. The album had its best results in Europe, where it peaked at No. 7 on the Ö3 Austria Top 75 Longplays chart. Furthermore, it spawned his biggest hit single, "Rockit" (1983), the first jazz hip-hop song, and became a worldwide anthem for breakdancers and the hip-hop culture of the 1980s. It reached the top 10 in several countries (especially in Europe), having its best performance on Swiss Singles Chart and Belgian Flemish Singles Chart, in each case at No. 4. It also won a RIAA Gold Award in 1990. Thanks to this song, Hancock won the Grammy Award for Best R&B Instrumental Performance, the first Grammy of his career of a total of fourteen.  Future Shock was a bigger success than even Head Hunters, winning a RIAA Platinum Award in 1994 faster than the earlier album had. It spawned an additional mainstream hit with "Autodrive" (1983), which had its best performance on UK Singles Chart, peaking at No. 33. Sound-System (1984) followed the musical direction of Future Shock and won the Grammy Award in the same category of "Rockit", making Hancock the first solo artist to win in this category for two consecutive years and also the artist with most wins in the category (a record shared with Earth, Wind & Fire and George Benson). After six years of silence in his solo career, Hancock signed with Mercury Records and released Dis Is da Drum (1994) that showed another innovation in his career with an acid jazz-oriented sound and reached No. 40 on the Swedish Albums Chart. After this release, there were several albums of duets, covers and tributes, such as Gershwin's World (1998), Possibilities (2005) and River: The Joni Letters (2007). The last peaked at No. 5 on the Billboard 200 and became the second jazz album in history to win a Grammy Award for Album of the Year (the first was Getz/Gilberto (1964) by Stan Getz and João Gilberto). As of 2016, Hancock's last original solo project was the electronic-influenced Future 2 Future (2001), released for Transparent Music.

Albums

Studio albums

Live albums

Releases that charted

Releases that did not chart

Compilations

Releases that charted

Releases that did not chart

 Some of these compilations were re-issued many times with different titles. Sometimes the re-issues included the same track list in a different order and/or with small variations with some bonus tracks.

Soundtrack albums

Singles

Physical singles

Physical releases that charted

Physical releases that did not chart

Promo singles
Note: Promo releases do not chart, because they are not sold, they are promotional items

Promo releases that charted

Promo releases that did not chart

Other charted songs

Other appearances

See also
 Herbie Hancock other appearances
 The Headhunters
 V.S.O.P.

Notes

a ^ From 1989, SNEP lists greatest hits and compilation albums of the artists in a compilation chart (already active from 1987 only for the various artists compilations).Prior the launch of the SNEP Singles Chart on November 3, 1984, there wasn't a reliable weekly chart for the singles in France. So, in 2000, Fabrice Ferment in collaboration with SNEP compiled monthly charts for the pre-SNEP chart period based on retail sales of the time.
b ^ Before Oricon launched the albums chart (started in 1987), it published only albums charts classified as follows: LPs (1970-1989), Cassettes (1974-1995) and CDs (1985-1997). For pre-1987 peak positions, the LP chart is used, as that was the main medium.
c ^ Prior September 8, 1993, the IFPI Swedish charts were bi-weekly.
d ^ Between October 20, 1984, and December 4, 1993, the Billboard jazz albums charts were bi-weekly. Note that Top Contemporary Jazz Albums was established on February 28, 1987, and before this date, Contemporary jazz albums were charted on the Top Traditional Jazz Albums (at the time known simply as Top Jazz Albums).
e ^ Between June 1, 1959, and August 24, 1985 Billboard published the Bubbling Under Hot 100 Singles, which ranked the songs that failed to chart on the Billboard Hot 100. In December 1970, a bubbling under chart was created for the albums that failed to enter into the Billboard 200 and was called Bubbling Under Top LPs. This list closed on August 24, 1985. The bubbling under charts came back on December 5, 1992, with Bubbling Under Hot 100 Singles and Bubbling Under R&B / Hip-Hop Singles. The latter lists the singles that failed to enter into the Hot R&B / Hip-Hop Songs.
f ^ RIAA certifications are based on shipment sales in the United States and, on request by the label, RIAA certifies albums and singles as Gold (500,000 units), Platinum (every 1 million units) and Diamond (every 10 million units).
g ^ BVMI certifications are based on retail sales in Germany calculated by GEMA and other societies. For the low sales of the jazz records, BVMI established a jazz division in 1992 only for albums and singles of the genre released from this date; on request by the label, BVMI certifies them as Gold (every 10,000 copies) and Platinum (every 20,000 copies).

References

External links
 Herbie Hancock Official website
 Herbie Hancock on AllMusic
 Herbie Hancock on Discogs

Discographies of American artists
Jazz discographies
Electronic music discographies
Discography